The Warehouse in Downtown Syracuse, New York, United States, is a former storage warehouse of the Syracuse-based Dunk and Bright Furniture Company. It was purchased in 2005 by Syracuse University, which renovated the building for classroom, gallery, and studio use at a cost of $9 million. The renovation was designed by Syracuse alumnus Richard Gluckman of New York City-based Gluckman Mayner Architects. It is currently home to the School of Design of the College of Visual and Performing Arts. In addition, the Goldring Arts Journalism Program is headquartered in the building. The design firm that developed the renovation was recently honored for their work on the Warehouse. As of 2014, the building has been given the official name of "The Nancy Cantor Warehouse" in honor of Chancellor Cantor, who was instrumental in the purchase and renovation of the building.

The Warehouse is a collaboration between Syracuse University and the Syracuse community which resulted in repurposing an underutilized building in Syracuse's historic Armory Square into an academic facility. The renovated structure provides flexible space for design studios, classrooms, and offices for the School of Design, while providing a downtown venue for public lectures, exhibitions, and galleries. The Warehouse marks the western boundary of the Connective Corridor, the cultural arts pathway connecting the main campus of Syracuse University to downtown and Armory Square. It underscores the growing momentum for the revitalization of downtown Syracuse.

School of Design

The Warehouse houses the Syracuse University School of Design and the University's central marketing team.  The ground floor offers a cafe, reading room, community classrooms, lecture hall, and work spaces, a community exhibition space and an international contemporary art gallery, and is the most public space in The Warehouse.  The first floor is home to the School of Design administrative offices, a large lecture space, a digital fabrication lab/wood shop, and the Genet Art Gallery.  The second floor are central marketing's offices.  The third floor is home to the Communications Design program; the fourth floor is home to the MFA in Collaborative Design, the Museum Studies program, and the Syracuse University Office of Community Engagement and Economic Development; the fifth floor is home to the Industrial + Interaction Design program; the sixth floor is home to the Environmental + Interior Design (EDI) program; and the seventh floor is home to the Fashion Design program. Part of The Warehouse's basement contains spray booths and a "dirty room" for messy projects.

The Warehouse Gallery
The gallery opened on April 29, 2006 under the temporary name Bridge Gallery, with Making Frames, a slide exhibition of the Gluckman Mayner architecture firm's projects,  organized by Jeffrey Hoone, Executive Director of CMAC. Elaine Quick was hired as Administrative Assistant for CMAC. Elaine is now the Programs Coordinator at The Warehouse Gallery. In late June 2006, curator and artist Astria Suparak was hired as the director of the gallery, renaming it The Warehouse Gallery. The first exhibition, CMAC: Roots of Collaboration, exhibited selections from each of the CMAC member collections, opened August 2007.

Artist Frank Olive was hired as Assistant Director in September 2006. Olive is now the exhibition designer and preparator at The Warehouse Gallery.

Faux Naturel, an exhibition of contemporary international work curated by Astria Suparak, ran from November 9, 2006 to January 7, 2007 at The Warehouse Gallery and toured to the Foreman Art Gallery at Bishop's University in July to August 2007. Artists included Alex Da Corte, Emily Vey Duke and Cooper Battersby, Nick Lenker, Annie MacDonell, Allyson Mitchell and Andrea Vander Kooij. The press release states, "Entropy, redemption, apocalypse, the fall from grace, the temptations of commercial culture, and the relationship between science and magic all emerge as motifs in this exhibition."

Embracing Winter, a group exhibition of knitted sculpture, psychedelic video, photography, and audio and book works by artists Janet Morton, Takeshi Murata, Bruno Munari, Collin Olan, Lisa M. Robinson and Rudy Shepherd, curated by Suparak, was on display from February 13 - March 31, 2007. It also featured interactive displays with take-home elements created by The Warehouse Gallery, a film screening titled "Winter Light" (curated by Suparak and filmmaker Brett Kashmere), and a video event by Daniel Barrow, "Winnipeg Babysitter."

Networked Nature, on exhibit from April 17, 2007 to July 17, 2007 was a group exhibition that explored the representation of “nature” through the perspective of networked culture. The exhibition included works by C5, Futurefarmers, Shih-Chieh Huang, Phil Ross, Stephen Vitiello and Gail Wight, who combined art and politics with innovative technology, such as global positioning systems (GPS), robotics and hydroponic environments. The exhibition was organized by Rhizome and Astria Suparak.

COME ON: Desire Under The Female Gaze, curated by Suparak, included artists Jo-Anne Balcaen, Juliet Jacobson, and Rachel Rampleman. The press release states, "Three young artists in Brooklyn and Montreal explicitly express desire, fantasy, disappointment, and pleasure" in videos, drawings, sculptures, and text works.

In July 2007 the Gallery was reorganized under the umbrella of the newly created SUArt Galleries at Syracuse University and Astria Suparak was dismissed as director of the Warehouse Gallery. The Gallery continued with Jeffrey Hoone as interim curator and after an international search Anja Chavez was hired as curator of contemporary art for the Warehouse Gallery and the SUArt Galleries.

Controversy 

The dismissal of Astria Suparak as director of the Gallery in 2007 led to protests and demonstrations by local and international artists, professors, civic leaders, students, and business owners. 
There was speculation that her forthcoming exhibition "Keep It Slick: Infiltrating Capitalism with The Yes Men," was canceled because of censorship. The University denied any claims of censorship.

References

External links
 Warehouse News - School of Architecture Warehouse News. Also has photos of the building in its current state.
 The Warehouse Gallery - Contemporary art gallery located in The Warehouse. Also has photos of the building in its current state.
 Desire in Syracuse: the 'Come On' Controversy. Yvonne Olivas. Fanzine.
 Syracuse Loses Again
 Censorship & Dismissal
 Dismissal of gallery curator sparks boycott

Warehouse
Warehouses in the United States
Commercial buildings in New York (state)